The Marun River (مارون (رودخانه)) is one of the main rivers in the Iranian province of Khuzestan. The name is also spelled as "Maroun." It is interrupted by the Marun Dam in Behbahan.

Marun River is a tributary of Karun River.

References 

Rivers of Khuzestan Province
 Landforms of Khuzestan Province